"Faces" is a song by Belgian/Dutch Eurodance band 2 Unlimited, released on 23 August 1993 as the third single from their second album, No Limits! (1993). Co-written by band members Ray Slijngaard and Anita Dels, it peaked at number eight in the United Kingdom and at number six on the Eurochart Hot 100. The accompanying music video was directed by Nick Burgess-Jones.

Release
The single version of "Faces" is a radio edit of the album version included on the No Limits! album internationally. "Faces (Radio Edit)" substitutes the less-palatable, harsh synth lead with a milder rendition of the same riff. In the United States, this radio edit of "Faces" was included on the No Limits! album instead of the album version found on all international pressings. In the UK, the radio edit of "Faces" omitted the main rap, but like "Tribal Dance", the song left in more vocals from Ray Slijngaard. The UK album version instead deletes Ray’s vocals during the main raps, but kept Ray’s spoken vocals during the break.

Chart performance
"Faces" scored chart success in many European countries, peaking at number two in their homeland of the Netherlands, number three in Belgium, number four in Spain and number five in Finland. The song also entered the top 10 in Austria (10), Germany (8), Ireland (7), Lithuania and the UK. In the latter, it peaked at number eight in its second week on the UK Singles Chart on 5 September 1993. The single spent two weeks at that position, and also peaked at number six on the UK Dance Singles Chart. In the Netherlands, it was kept from reaching the top position by 4 Non Blondes' "What's Up?". 

"Faces" was a top-10 hit also on the Eurochart Hot 100, where it reached number six, and on the European Dance Radio Chart, where it reached number two in October 1993, being held off the top spot by Mariah Carey's "Dreamlover". Additionally, the song was a top-20 hit in France (16), Italy (13) and Sweden (11). Outside Europe, "Faces" peaked at number 54 in Australia.

Critical reception
In his weekly UK chart commentary, James Masterton wrote, "This new single if anything contains more depth than their average work, with changes of tempo rife throughout." Alan Jones from Music Week felt it was "a more complex than usual offering from the Dutch duo who eschew their simple and highly effective straight-ahead rave style in favour of a tempo-changing and less instant song." He added, "They'll pay the price at retail with one of their smaller hits to date, though the Top 20 is still a cert." Gail Heritage from Port Lincoln Times named it a "favourite" of the album, remarking that it "opens the door to recognising people for their own individuality." James Hamilton from the RM Dance Update described it as a "techno synth buzzed but unrushed tinkling blippy sweet loper". Toby Anstis reviewed the song for Smash Hits, stating that "this is just a taster of what the album sounds like". He added that "it'll be a hit". Australian Woroni named "Faces" an "obvious highlight" of the No Limits! album, along with "No Limit" and "Tribal Dance".

Music video
A music video was produced to promote the single, directed by British director Nick Burgess-Jones. The backdrop of the video depicts a futuristic desert landscape where Ray and Anita are surrounded by machines and screens, where different faces are shown. Sometimes the duo is seen in black-and-white, with the surroundings still in colours. "Faces" received heavy rotation on MTV Europe in September 1993. There were made two different edits of the video; the rap version and the no rap version. The rap version was later published on 2 Unlimited's official YouTube channel in July 2014, and as of December 2022, It had generated more than 1,6 million views. Burgess-Jones had previously directed the videos for "No Limit" and "Tribal Dance".

Track listing

Charts

Weekly charts

Year-end charts

References

1993 songs
1993 singles
2 Unlimited songs
Pete Waterman Entertainment singles
Songs written by Jean-Paul De Coster
Songs written by Phil Wilde
Songs written by Ray Slijngaard
Songs written by Anita Doth
Byte Records singles
ZYX Music singles
Music videos directed by Nick Burgess-Jones